The AFI Catalog of Feature Films, also known as the AFI Catalog, is an ongoing project by the American Film Institute (AFI) to catalog all commercially-made and theatrically exhibited American motion pictures from the birth of cinema in 1893 to the present. It began as a series of hardcover books known as The American Film Institute Catalog of Motion Pictures, and subsequently became an exclusively online filmographic database.

Each entry in the catalog typically includes the film's title, physical description, production and distribution companies, production and release dates, cast and production credits, a plot summary, song titles, and notes on the film's history. The films are indexed by personal credits, production and distribution companies, year of release, and major and minor plot subjects.

To qualify for the "Feature Films" volumes, a film must have been commercially produced either on American soil or by an American company. In accordance with the International Federation of Film Archives (FIAF; French: Fédération Internationale des Archives du Film), the film must have also been given a theatrical release in 35 mm or larger gauge to the general public, with a running time of at least 40 minutes (or a length of at least four reels). With that said, the Catalog has included over 17,000 short films (those less than 40 minutes/four reels) from the first era of filmmaking (1893–1910).

The print version comprises five volumes documenting all films produced in the United States from 1892 to 1993, while new records are created by the AFI editorial team and added each year to the online database.

History 
In 1965, the "Arts and Humanities Bill" was signed into law by U.S. President Lyndon B. Johnson; it established the American Film Institute (AFI), as well as the National Endowment for the Arts and the National Endowment for the Humanities. As there was no existing listings of films of the past—making preservation an immediate concern—the Bill obliged the AFI to build a new "catalog" of feature films that would protect cultural history from being lost in obscurity or disappearing entirely.

In 1967, the AFI officially began operation, documenting the first century of American filmmaking through the AFI Catalog of Feature Films. The Catalog would be the very first scholarly listing of American films, "with academically vetted information about the existence, availability and sources of motion pictures already produced, spanning the entirety of the art form since 1893."

From 1968 to 1971, AFI researched film production between 1921 and 1930 (i.e., the 1920s). The first AFI Catalog was published thereafter in 1971 by the University of California Press; the publication featured, as encyclopedic volumes, the records for every American feature film released during the 1920s' period.

Hardcover publications 
The Catalog began as a series of hardcover books known as The American Film Institute Catalog of Motion Pictures, published by the University of California Press(excluding vol. A) from 1971 to 1993.

The print version comprises seven volumes documenting all films produced in the United States from 1892 to 1970. The publication of the hardcover volumes was suspended due to budgetary reasons after volume F4 (1941–50) in 1997. Feature films released from 1951 to 1960 and from 1971 to 1993 have been cataloged only in the online database.

The project estimates that additional years will be cataloged at 6-month intervals. Film School students are offered the opportunity to provide plot synopses and original research, but input from other, experienced film researchers is not encouraged. The project will also eventually catalog short films (beyond 1910) and newsreels.

See also

 Film Index International – the British Film Institute's catalog
 IMDb – international online database for film, television, and video games
 The Criterion Collection
 International Federation of Film Archives
 Swank Digital Campus

References

External links
  – official site
The International Film Index, 1895–1990

American Film Institute
Catalogues
Film guides
Books about film
Online film databases